"Weekend" is a song written by English singer-songwriter Mick Jackson and Tommy Mayer, and released in 1978 on Jackson's Weekend album.  It was then covered in 1979 by the American group Wet Willie where it peaked at number 29 on the U.S. Billboard Hot 100 during the summer of the year.  Jackson's version charted in the United Kingdom, reaching #38.

"Weekend" was the first release from their album, Which One's Willie?  The song was their final top 40 single under the group's name before their rebranding under the name of the lead singer, Jimmy Hall. The song also charted in Canada, reaching number 34.

The song emphasizes the importance of fun and relaxation following a busy work week. The lyrics also express the urgent need to make the most of life during youth.

Radio station KYBG in Lafayette, Louisiana, plays the Wet Willie version of the song at 5:00 PM every Friday as a weekend kickoff.

Charts
Mick Jackson

Wet Willie

References

External links
 

1979 songs
1979 singles
Atlantic Records singles
Epic Records singles
Wet Willie songs
Mick Jackson (singer) songs